The prime minister of the Faroe Islands is the head of government of the Faroe Islands.

The Faroese term  literally means "lawman" and originally referred to the legal function of lawspeaker. This old title was brought back into use to refer to the head of government after the islands obtained Home Rule in 1948. This translation does not apply to the pre-1816 office, only the modern leaders of the Faroese government.

List of Løgmenn

Løgmenn as lawmen (–1816)
Many of the earlier holders of this position are not known.

Løgmenn as Prime Ministers during the Home Rule era (1948–present)

See also
Politics of the Faroe Islands
List of deputy prime ministers of the Faroe Islands

References

 
Faroe Islands, prime ministers of
Prime Minister